MDNA World Tour is the fourth live album by American singer and songwriter Madonna. It was released on September 6, 2013, by Interscope Records as a full concert on all formats including a double-disc CD, DVD, and Blu-ray. Madonna had embarked on the MDNA Tour for promotion of her twelfth studio album MDNA. The tour was a commercial success although it courted a number of controversies. The performances at the American Airlines Arena in Miami, Florida during the North American leg of the MDNA Tour were documented for video release. The recording was directed by Danny B. Tull and Stephane Sennour who included footage from other shows of the tour.

Madonna had spent six months editing the footage from the films and together with Tull and Sennour, she developed the video for the songs she had performed as a mini-movie. Shot as a documentary, MDNA World Tour included the best shots available from different locations of the tour, while emphasizing Madonna's impact on the younger generation of artists. Prior to the release, a concert television special, Madonna: The MDNA Tour, was broadcast in the United States by Epix on June 22, 2013. A premiere took place at the Paris Theater, in New York City the same month.

The release received mixed reviews from critics, with one group of reviewers commending the technicality and the visuals attached with the show, while others noting the absence of Madonna's hit songs from the set list. After the release, news outlets around the world wrote about bad manufacturing of the CD and DVD, with many buyers reportedly choosing to return their purchase. Within a week Interscope released a statement, redacting the Blu-ray discs in the United States.

MDNA World Tour reached the top of the album chart in Hungary, and top-ten in France, Italy, Russia, and Spain, but it failed to achieve high chart positions similar to the singer's previous live albums in the United States and United Kingdom. However, the video version enjoyed more success, reaching number one in most DVD charts worldwide and earning triple platinum in Brazil, platinum in Canada and Portugal, and gold in Poland. The release topped the US Billboard Top Music Videos chart with sales of 11,000 copies, becoming her sixth consecutive and tenth video to top the chart—the most for any artist.

Background and tour
On March 23, 2012, Madonna released her twelfth studio album, entitled MDNA, by Interscope Records. The singer worked with a variety of producers such as Alle Benassi, Benny Benassi, Demolition Crew, Free School, Michael Malih, Indiigo, William Orbit and Martin Solveig on the album. An electronic album, MDNA lyrically explores themes such as partying, love for music, infatuation, as well as heartbreak, revenge and separation. The album received generally positive reviews from music critics. Upon its release, it debuted at number one in many countries worldwide, including Australia, Canada, Italy, Spain, the United Kingdom and the United States.

To promote the album, Madonna embarked on the MDNA Tour, which was her ninth concert tour. The tour visited America, Europe and the Middle East, while also marking the singer's first performances in the United Arab Emirates, Ukraine, Scotland and Colombia. Described by her as "the journey of a soul from darkness to light", the MDNA Tour was divided into four sections: Transgression, where guns and violence was the main theme, Prophecy, where a mix of joyful songs that bring people together are performed, Masculine/Feminine, a combination of sensuality and fashion with a few of Madonna's classic songs performed in a French Cabaret-style, and Redemption, which Madonna labelled as "a big party and celebration". The tour received positive reviews, but courted many controversial subjects such as violence, firearms, human rights, nudity and politics. Nevertheless, it was a commercial success and many venues were instantly sold out. After completion, it was dubbed the highest-grossing tour of 2012 by Billboard. Total gross was $305.2 million from 88 sold-out shows, becoming the tenth highest-grossing tour of all time and surpassing Celine Dion's Taking Chances World Tour as the second highest-grossing tour among female artists, behind Madonna's own Sticky & Sweet Tour.

Development and release

Initially, the filming of the concert was planned for the shows in Colombia, but due to conflicts with the directors' schedule, those shows were not filmed. Instead, Madonna announced on her Facebook page that the November 19 and 20 shows in Miami, at the American Airlines Arena, would be filmed for the upcoming tour DVD and Blu-ray release. After accepting the award for Top Touring Artist at the 2013 Billboard Music Awards, Madonna confirmed that she had just finished editing the DVD of the concert, with Billboard predicting the video release to be in September 2013. It was officially announced by Madonna's website that the video album for the tour will be released on August 26, 2013, by Live Nation and Interscope Records; the date was later changed to September 6 and 9 for non-US countries and September 10 for US. It documented the November 19 and 20 shows at the American Airlines Arena, but also will include footage from other concert dates. The documentary was directed by Danny B. Tull and Stephane Sennour—who also directed the YouTube concert special MDNA: Live à l'Olympia and the behind-the-scenes documentary Inside the DNA of MDNA—and was produced by Madonna. MDNA World Tour is Madonna's tenth live video album and was released on both DVD and Blu-ray. Madonna had spent six months editing the footage from the films and together with Tull and Sennour she constructed each of the performances in the video as a mini-movie.

According to Entertainment Weekly, MDNA World Tour shed light on the impact Madonna has had on the younger generation of artists, dancers, and general fans "who refuse to conform for conformity's sake". Tull took the best moments from the 88 different concerts of the tour, to create a cohesive documentary. He recalled that there were numerous footage available from the tour and they had to find the "perfect" shot for Madonna. He gave an example that the performance of "Like a Prayer" had cuts from 50 countries alone. "It was really intense. I think I looked down one day and I was like, 'Oh, my fingers are about to fall off'. But it was worth it", Tull concluded. A preview for the DVD was first shown at the Billboard Music Awards and another preview was released in June 2013, showing the singer performing "Give Me All Your Luvin'" on the tour, the lead single from MDNA. Another video showed Madonna auditioning for the dancers, while singing an acoustic version of her 2001 single, "Don't Tell Me".

A television broadcast of the concert, titled Madonna: The MDNA Tour, aired on Epix in the United States on June 22, 2013. The concert premiered at 8 p.m. EST on Epix's TV network and online at EpixHD.com and on Epix apps. On June 18, the concert special had a world premiere screening at the Paris Theater, in New York City, with Madonna attending the event in a press conference with the media, celebrities, and fans. A contest was released just for US residents, who had the chance to win two invitations for the special event. The singer wore a black tuxedo and a top hat to the premiere, the ensemble being a tribute to actress Marlene Dietrich and her similar attire in the 1930 film, Morocco. The singer had a Q&A session and also showed a trailer of her secretprojectrevolution film with photographer Steven Klein.

Critical reception

Arnold Wayne Jones from the Dallas Voice gave the album four out of five stars, writing that the show "has all of the Material Girl's majesty and fetishistic eroticism, merged with lots of disturbing, violent imagery and a huge catalog of songs". Jones concluded that Madonna was more provocative than before with the release. Chuck Campbell from The Republic gave the album three and a half stars out of five, writing that "an ambitious woman like Madonna will not let herself become a nostalgia act". He added that Madonna makes that clear every time she goes on tour: "she's living in the moment, and she's all about her newest material." The Advocates review for the release was positive, saying that the DVD affirms the fact that Madonna's "musical reign continues". Entertainment Focus' Pip Ellwood-Hughes felt that the highlights of the record were the live performances of "Human Nature" and "Like a Prayer". He concluded the review by saying that " Making perfect use of her dancers, the video screens and the sets, the MDNA World Tour is one of [Madonna's] most spectacular to date and she still performs with the passion and the energy she always has done. If you went to the show then get your copy of this and treat it like a souvenir. If you didn't you need to check it out as it's one of the best shows she's ever done."

Stephen Thomas Erlewine from AllMusic awarded the release three out of five stars, saying that "there are unexpected musical moments that do make MDNA World Tour worth hearing", including the performance of "Like a Virgin" and "Like a Prayer". However, he felt that the CD release was unnecessary since the album would be a better experience with its video. The North Jersey Media Group gave the DVD 2.5 starts out of five, saying that Madonna felt to be "overly" attached to her contemporary songs than her classic releases. They added "that plodding through overlong arrangements of inconsequential songs — from the annoyingly vocoder-treated 'Revolver' early to the throwaway dance cut 'Celebration' at the end — will leave listeners wondering why so many substantial hits were given only a nod, if anything at all." A review by Kevin Taft in online website "Edge on the Net" was overall negative. Taft noticed that Madonna's vocals were altered and mixed so much that it sounded disembodied and did not match the singer's lips. He was "shocked" to find that the audio CDs also contained the badly mixed songs. The reviewer explained that "The choice to have the backing track turned down so low doesn't help much either. In fact, it makes it sound as if Madonna is on a cabaret stage with a five-piece band... For the six months it took Madge to edit her concert, one would wish she got her vocals to match her lips." However, Taft commended the overall show and the technical brilliance accompanying it.

Mastering issues
In an online chat with website Reddit, Madonna addressed the concerns regarding the mastering issues with the DVD and Blu-ray in Europe, saying that she was horrified about the glitches and her record label was solving it. She concluded by saying that "[I] spent 6 months editing and doing the sound mix for the DVD the last thing I want to hear is that the fans aren't getting the fruits of my labor." On September 23, 2013, Interscope Records announced that they were recalling all the Blu-ray discs issued in US, after hearing continuous reports of glitches in the sound from consumers, adding that an "error in manufacturing" compromised the 5.1 audio of the discs. The announcement also added the following:
"Interscope Records would like to make consumers of Madonna's MDNA World Tour Blu-ray disc aware that the concert will be seen at its most optimal quality by properly adjusting the settings on your television to 'Normal/Movie' mode rather than 'Dynamic/Enhanced' mode. Older Blu-ray players or those without a firmware upgrade may experience glitches when navigating the Blu-ray menu. Follow the manufacturer's instructions to upgrade firmware.

Commercial performance

In the United States, MDNA World Tour failed to debut within the top-forty of the Billboard 200, unlike her previous live albums, and entered at number 90 with 4,000 copies sold becoming her 26th entry on the chart. However, it entered at number one on the Top Music Videos chart with sales of 11,000 copies, becoming her sixth consecutive and tenth video to top the chart—the most for any artist. MDNA World Tour was preceded by Madonna (four weeks at number-one in 1985), Madonna Live: The Virgin Tour (10 weeks in 1986), Ciao Italia: Live from Italy (eight weeks in 1988), The Immaculate Collection (four weeks in 1991), Drowned World Tour 2001 (one week in 2001), I'm Going to Tell You a Secret (two weeks in 2006), The Confessions Tour (two weeks in 2007), Celebration: The Video Collection (one week in 2009) and Sticky & Sweet Tour (one week in 2010). Keith Caulfield from Billboard noted that the debut on the Billboard 200 was with considerably lesser sales than the preceding album, Sticky & Sweet Tour, which entered the chart at number ten with sales of 28,000 copies and atop the Top Music Videos with 5,000 copies. Caulfield theorized that the only availability of MDNA World Tour as a digital album and CD on demand from Amazon.com hindered its ranking on the chart and issuing the album on the traditional music release formats of CD-DVD combo would have increased sales. The following week, MDNA World Tour held on to the top spot of the Top Music Videos chart, with an additional sales of 3,000 copies. MDNA World Tour became the 29th best selling music video on the year end tabulation of Billboard.

A midweek prediction by Music Week magazine had MDNA World Tour listed at position 37 of the UK Albums Chart. It ultimately debuted at number 55 on the chart with sales of 1,759 copies while topping the DVD chart of the country with bigger first week sales of 5,599 copies. MDNA World Tour became Madonna's first live album not to enter the top-twenty of the UK Albums Chart, after the top-twenty placements at number 18 (14,449 sales) with I'm Going to Tell You a Secret (2006), number seven (22,227 sales) with The Confessions Tour (2007) and number 17 (12,405 sales) with Sticky & Sweet Tour (2010). As of September 2017, it has sold 23,220 copies in the country. The album's highest placement was in Hungary, where it reached the top of the chart. It also attained top ten positions in France, Italy, Russia and Spain, while reaching top twenty in Poland and Portugal. Its lowest position was attained in Belgium Flanders region, where it failed to enter the top 100 of the Ultratop chart, reaching a peak of number 116. MDNA World Tour was successful on the DVD listings of most of the nations, reaching the top of the charts of 17 providers. However, in Australia the album version was disqualified from charting in the ARIA Albums Chart, but it reached the top of the DVD charts for the issue of September 16, 2013.

Track listing

CD

Blu-ray / DVD

Notes
 signifies additional lyrics by
 Track list adapted from AllMusic.
"Express Yourself" also contains a sample of Lady Gaga's song "Born This Way" but the use is not credited in the album's liner notes.

Personnel
Credits adapted from MDNA World Tour liner notes:

Madonna – creator, vocals, guitar, producer
Kiley Dean – backing vocals
Nicki Richards – backing vocals
Kalakan Trio – backing band
Monte Pittman – guitar
Brian Frasier Moore – drums
Ric'key Pageot – keyboards, upright piano
Jason Yang – violin
Kevin Antunes – music director, keyboards, programmer
Danny B. Tull – director
Stephane Sennour – director
Michel Laprise – show drector
Anthony Talauega – show co-drector
Richmond Talauega – show co-drector
Tiffany Olson – associate director
Smasher Desmedt – technical drector
Mark Ritchie – photography
Arthur Fogel – executive producer
Guy Oseary – executive producer
Jake Berry – production manager
Sean Spuehler – engineer
Al Gurdon – lighting designer
Arianne Phillips – costume designer
Danny O'Bryen – line producer
Jonathan Lia – line producer
Mark Fisher – set designer
Demo Castellon – sound designer
Glenn Erwin – sound designer
Kevin Antunes – sound designer
Danny Tull – video editor

Charts

Weekly album charts

Monthly album charts

Year-end album charts

Weekly video charts

Year-end video charts

Certifications and sales

Release history

Notes

References

External links
Madonna.com > MDNA Tour
 

2013 live albums
2013 video albums
Interscope Records live albums
Interscope Records video albums
Live video albums
Madonna live albums
Madonna video albums